Munjeong may refer to any of the listed ones. 

Munjeong, a female Korean given name
Queen Munjeong, third queen consort of King Jungjong of Joseon
Munjeong-dong, a dong (neighbourhood) of Songpa-gu, Seoul, South Korea
Munjeong station, subway station near Munjeong-dong
Munjeong-dong Rodeo Street, located in Munjeong-dong, a big shopping district in South Korea